Spur Point is a point at the east end of Bigla Ridge, a black, rocky spur which extends southeast between Sleipnir Glacier and Beaglehole Glacier to the west side of Cabinet Inlet, forming the southeast extremity of Heros Peninsula on the east coast of Graham Land. This descriptive name was given by the Falkland Islands Dependencies Survey (FIDS) following their survey in 1947. The feature was photographed from the air during 1947 by the Ronne Antarctic Research Expedition (RARE) under Ronne.

Headlands of Graham Land
Foyn Coast